The 2010 FIVB Volleyball Men's Club World Championship was the 6th edition of the event. It was held in Doha, Qatar from 15 to 21 December 2010.

Qualification

Pools composition

Squads

Venue

Preliminary round
All times are Arabia Standard Time (UTC+03:00).

Pool A

|}

|}

Pool B

|}

|}

Final round
All times are Arabia Standard Time (UTC+03:00).

Semifinals

|}

3rd place match

|}

Final

|}

Final standing

Awards

Most Valuable Player
 Osmany Juantorena (Trentino BetClic)
Best Scorer
 Federico Pereyra (Drean Bolívar)
Best Spiker
 Osmany Juantorena (Trentino BetClic)
Best Blocker
 Mohammad Mousavi (Paykan Tehran)

Best Server
 Luciano De Cecco (Drean Bolívar)
Best Setter
 Raphael Oliveira (Trentino BetClic)
Best Libero
 Paweł Zatorski (PGE Skra Bełchatów)

External links
Official website
Final Standing
Awards
Prize Money

2010 FIVB Men's Club World Championship
FIVB Men's Club World Championship
FIVB Men's Club World Championship
FIVB Volleyball Men's Club World Championship
Sports competitions in Doha